Walter Sutherland may refer to:
Walter Sutherland (Norn) (died 1850), last native speaker of Norn
Walter Sutherland (rugby union) (1890–1918), Scottish rugby union footballer